The Abteymour oil field is an Iranian oil field located in Khuzestan Province, in 25 km from west of the Ahvaz City. It was discovered in 1967 and the production was started in 1991. Its oil reserves have been estimated at 12.2 bn barrel. The field is owned by state-owned National Iranian Oil Company (NIOC) and operated by National Iranian South Oil Company (NISOC).

See also

List of oil fields

References

Oil fields of Iran